Alexei Mikhailovich Markov (born 26 May 1979 in Moscow) is a Russian former professional track and road bicycle racer.

Major results

Track

1996
 2nd  Team pursuit, Summer Olympics
1997
 UCI World Cup
1st Individual pursuit, Cali
1st Team pursuit, Cali
1st Individual pursuit, Trexlertown
1st Team pursuit, Trexlertown
 2nd  Individual pursuit, UCI World Championships
1998
 UCI World Cup
3rd Individual pursuit, Hyères
3rd Team pursuit, Hyères
3rd Team pursuit, Berlin
1999
 UCI World Cup
2nd Individual pursuit, Fiorenzuola d'Arda
3rd Team pursuit, Fiorenzuola d'Arda
 3rd  Team pursuit, UCI World Championships
2000
 UCI World Cup
1st Team pursuit, Moscow
3rd Individual pursuit, Moscow
 3rd  Points race, Summer Olympics
2001
 UCI World Cup
1st Team pursuit, Mexico City
3rd Overall Individual pursuit
3rd Individual pursuit, Szczecin
3rd Individual pursuit, Mexico City
2002
 UCI World Cup
1st Team pursuit, Moscow
3rd Individual pursuit, Moscow
2003
 1st Team pursuit, Moscow, UCI World Cup
2004
 UEC European Championships
1st  Omnium
1st  Derny
 UCI World Cup
3rd Team pursuit, Moscow
3rd Individual pursuit, Moscow
2007
 2nd  Madison, European Championships (with Nikolai Trussov)
 2nd Individual pursuit, Copenhagen, UCI World Cup
2008
 UCI World Cup
2nd Individual pursuit, Melbourne
3rd Individual pursuit, Copenhagen
 3rd  Madison (with Mikhail Ignatiev), Summer Olympics
 3rd  Individual pursuit, UCI World Championships
2010
 UCI World Cup
1st Team pursuit, Pekin
2nd Points race, Pekin
2nd Team pursuit, Melbourne 
 2nd  Team pursuit, UEC European Championships
2011
 UCI World Cup
1st Team pursuit, Astana
1st Team pursuit, Pekin
 National Championships
1st  Madison
1st  Team pursuit
 2nd  Team pursuit, UCI World Championships
2012
 1st  Team pursuit, UEC European Championships

Road

1997
 3rd  Time trial, UCI Junior Road World Championships
1999
 1st Stage 1 Vuelta a Navarra
 1st Stage 1 
2000
 1st Overall 
1st Stages 1 & 3
 1st Stages 1, 3 & 5 Cinturón a Mallorca
2001
 2nd Road race, National Road Championships
 2nd Overall International Tour of Rhodes
 5th Memorial Manuel Galera
2002
 1st Stages 2 & 4 Trofeú Joaquim Agostinho
 2nd Overall GP CTT Correios de Portugal
1st Stages 3 & 5
 8th Memorial Manuel Galera
2003
 2nd Overall Gran Premio Mosqueteros-Ruta del Marqués
 3rd Overall GP CTT Correios de Portugal
 3rd Clásica de Almería
 7th Trofeo Cala Millor-Cala Bona
2004
 1st Stages 2 & 8 Tour de Normandie
 4th Memoriał Andrzeja Trochanowskiego
 4th Overall Jadranska Magistrala
2005
 1st Overall GP CTT Correios de Portugal
1st Stages 1, 2
 1st Stages 2 & 4 GP Internacional do Oeste RTP
 1st Stage 1 Trofeú Joaquim Agostinho
 1st Stage 3 Volta ao Algarve
 7th Overall GP Costa Azul
2006
 1st Stage 1 Vuelta a La Rioja
2007
 1st Stage 1 (TTT Tour Méditerranéen
2008
 1st Stage 3 Grand Prix of Sochi
2009
 4th Kampioenschap van Vlaanderen
 8th Omloop van het Houtland
 9th Nokere-Koerse
 10th Paris–Brussels
2010
 3rd Overall Tour of Hainan
1st Stage 8
2011
 1st Prologue Tour of China
 1st Stage 3 Flèche du Sud
 3rd ProRace Berlin

External links 
 
 
 
 Alexei Markov (in German language)

1979 births
Living people
Russian male cyclists
Russian track cyclists
Olympic cyclists of Russia
Cyclists at the 1996 Summer Olympics
Cyclists at the 2000 Summer Olympics
Cyclists at the 2004 Summer Olympics
Cyclists at the 2008 Summer Olympics
Cyclists at the 2012 Summer Olympics
Olympic silver medalists for Russia
Olympic bronze medalists for Russia
Cyclists from Moscow
Olympic medalists in cycling
Medalists at the 2008 Summer Olympics
Medalists at the 2000 Summer Olympics
Medalists at the 1996 Summer Olympics